John Riddy (born 1959) is a British photographer who came to the fore after his solo exhibition at Camden Arts Centre in 2000. He lives and works in London and has exhibited internationally since 1998.

Life and career 

Riddy started taking and printing photographs at the age of 14 and earned a BA and MA in Fine Art at Chelsea School of Art (1980–84).
Since his first solo exhibition in 1993 Riddy has consistently worked in series, with an emphasis on considered description. Architecture, the particularities of place and the urban environment have been constant subjects, whilst the starting point for many of his series has been the relationship between photography and the history of art and architecture. Typical examples are the autobiography of John Ruskin, the woodblock prints of Hokusai  and the photographs of Gustave le Gray. Choices about format, materials and technique have been intrinsic to each series and Riddy’s focus has been on the exhibited print.

Exhibitions 

In 1993 Riddy had his first solo exhibition with the Cairn Gallery. Shortly afterwards he started working with Frith Street Gallery who continue to represent him. His first survey exhibition was at Camden Arts Centre in 2000  and he showed his series Views from Shin-Fuji at the Victoria and Albert Museum in 2006. He has exhibited regularly with Galerie Paul Andriesse in the Netherlands  and Lawrence Markey in the USA.
His exhibition Palermo at Frith Street gallery in 2013 was reviewed by theguardian.com and Aesthetica Magazine. Aesthetica described the photographs as "anything but spontaneous. Physical decay of the urban landscape is juxtaposed with a remarkable formal beauty just as, in a more conceptual sense, time and timelessness contend with each other in these works". Adrian Searle commented "If his photographs have anything to do with Cartier-Bresson's "decisive moment", it is a moment that has taken months and several visits to present itself. It is the moment when everything seems alive but precisely nothing is happening.".

Solo exhibitions 

Riddy's solo exhibitions include Photographs, De Pont Museum of Contemporary Art, Tilburg, Half-light, Frith Street Gallery, London, 2018, Palermo, Frith Street Gallery, London, 2013, Low Relief - Photographs of London, Frith Street Gallery, London, 2009, Views from Shin-Fuji, Victoria and Albert Museum, London, 2006, John Riddy, Camden Arts Centre, 2000,John Riddy, De La Warr Pavilion, Bexhill-on-Sea, 2000 and Praeterita, touring exhibition, Ruskin Gallery, Sheffield, Brantwood, Coniston, Ruskin Library, Lancaster, 2000.

Group exhibitions 
Recent group exhibitions featuring Riddy's work include Beyond Documentary, Museum of London, London (2018), Summer Breeze: An Ensemble of Gallery Artists, Frith Street Gallery, London (2017), A Certain Kind of Light, Towner Art Gallery, Eastbourne (2017), Selected Works (Riddy, Frecon, Bishop and Zurier), Lawrence Markey, San Antonio, TX (2015) 40 Years – 40 Artists, UMCA University of Massachusetts Amherst, MA (2015), Ruin Lust, Tate Britain, London (2014), Silver, Frith Street Gallery, London (2014), Revealed: Government Art Collection, Whitechapel Gallery, London (2011) and Romantics, Tate Britain, London (2010), among others.

Collections 

Southampton City Art Gallery, Hampshire
Tate, London
Victoria and Albert Museum, London
De Pont Museum of Contemporary Art, Tilburg
Stedelijk Museum, Amsterdam
Arts Council of Great Britain, London
British Council Collection
Government Art Collection UK
Museum of London
Margulies Collection
BBC Collection, London
Hiscox Collection 
Goldman Sachs International

Publications 

John Riddy: Photographs (2019), essay by Michael Fried and conversation with James Welling, edited by Liz Jobey, Göttingen: Steidl, 
John Riddy: Views from Shin-Fuji (2013), published by Frith Street Books, London 
John Riddy: Palermo (2013), published by Frith Street Books, London 
John Riddy – 8 Skies (2004), published by Frith Street Gallery and Paul Andriesse 
John Riddy (2000), published by Camden Arts Centre in association with the de la Warr Pavilion 
John Riddy: Praeterita (2000), published by the Ruskin School of Drawing 
Rome, published by Lawrence Markey Gallery, New York, 1999

Other critical writings 

John Riddy: Palermo, London | Aesthetica Magazine
James Castle/ John Riddy | Frieze
John Riddy: Photographs, De Pont | nrc.nl (dutch)
Rachel Withers, Art Forum, June 2009
Rebecca Geldard, Time Out Exhibition of the Week, March 2009

References

External links 
Official website
John Riddy | TateShots
John Riddy's London | TateShots
John Riddy: Frith Street Gallery

1959 births
Living people
Photographers from London
Alumni of Chelsea College of Arts